The Sa'ar 3 class ("Cherbourg") is a series of missile boats built in Cherbourg, France at the Amiot Shipyard based on an Israeli Navy modification of the German Navy's . They are also known as the stars of Cherbourg.

Design and development 
The Israeli naval command had reached the conclusion by the early 1960s that their old Second World War-era destroyers, frigates and corvettes were obsolete and new ships and vessels were needed.  Yitzhak Shoshan, later to command the destroyer INS Eilat at the time of her sinking, surveyed the available torpedo boat designs and recommended the German .  The Israeli Navy asked Lürssen, the shipyard which built the Jaguar class, to modify the wooden Jaguar-class design by switching to steel construction, adding  to the length, and revising the internal compartmentalization.  Due to Arab League pressure on the German government, this plan was not continued and a new builder was sought.  The Israeli Navy discovered that the Cherbourg-based Constructions Mécaniques de Normandie owned by Félix Amiot had experience building patrol boats in cooperation with Lürssen and would build the boats, based upon the German designs and plans.  The engines were imported from Germany.  The project received the code name "Falling Leaves". After the last 5 built were placed under embargo by the government of France, they were retrieved in the Cherbourg Project.

Operational history 
The Sa'ar 3 boats' first battle engagements were made during the October 1973 Yom Kippur War. During this war, the first surface-to-surface missile naval engagements took place. The first was at the Battle of Latakia where the Israeli Navy defeated many Syrian boats and coastal targets using Otobreda 76 mm guns and missiles.  This was followed shortly thereafter by Israeli defeat of Egyptian forces at the Battle of Baltim.

In the 1980s, one of the Sa'ar boats got stuck in the Coastal waters of Saudi Arabia. Saudi Arabian authorities allowed the Israeli navy to free the ship and to take it away.

Vessels in the class 
 INS Sa'ar (Tempest)
 INS Sufa (Storm)
 INS Ga'ash (Volcanic Storm)
 INS Herev (Sword)
 INS Hanit (Spear) - sold to Chile in 1988, renamed Iquique
 INS Hetz (Arrow) - sold to Chile in 1988, renamed Covadonga

See also
 Cherbourg Project

References

Notes

Bibliography
 

Missile boat classes
Missile boats of the Israeli Navy
Missile boats of the Chilean Navy
Cherbourg-Octeville